Orphan Black – 7 Genes ( known internationally as Orphan Black Japan), launched December 2, 2017, on Fuji Television, is a Japanese remake of the BBC Worldwide show Orphan Black. It stars South Korean actress and singer Kang Ji-young as Sara Aoyama, a broke and desperate single mother who witnesses the shocking suicide of a woman who looks just like her. The remake was produced by Telepack for Tokai TV under licence from BBC Worldwide.

Characters 
 Kang Ji-young as Sara Aoyama/Maoko Shiina
 Ikusaburo Yamazaki as Makio Iwaki
 Shun Nishime as Kaoru Aoyama
 Saori Takizawa as Ayano Kimura
 Koki Okada as Tsuyoshi Kinjou
 Tsutomu Takahashi as Nagase
 Naoto Takenaka as Wakita
 Yumi Asou as Saeko Aoyama
 Rin Shouno as Moe Aoyama

References

External links
 

Orphan Black
2017 Japanese television series debuts
Biopunk television series
Television series about cloning
Japanese LGBT-related drama television series
Japanese science fiction television series
Lesbian-related television shows
Transgender-related television shows
Television series about siblings
Television series about twins
2010s LGBT-related drama television series
Japanese thriller television series
Japanese television series based on Canadian television series
Fuji TV dramas